Françoise Aron Ulam (March 8, 1918, in Paris, France — April 30, 2011) was the wife of Polish-American mathematician, Stanislaw Ulam, member of the Manhattan Project.

Biography

In 1938, she came to the United States as an exchange student. She studied at Mills College and Mount Holyoke College, earning Master's degree in comparative literature.

In 1939 she met Stanislaw Ulam  and married him in 1941. She followed Stanislaw's involvement in the Manhattan Project in Santa Fe and Los Alamos. 

In Los Alamos, Francoise, while not being a member of the Project staff, became part of the international community of scientists and mathematicians. She devoted herself to creating a home and raising a daughter, Claire.

She was granted American citizenship in 1945. 

Both Françoise and Stanislaw lost family members in the Holocaust.

In 1984, when her husband died, Françoise arranged for Santa Fe Institute to receive Stanislaw Ulam's library.

in 1998 she published her memoirs, De Paris à Los Alamos: Une odyssée franco-américaine [From Paris to Los Alamos: A Franco-American Odyssey].

On April 30, 2011, Françoise died at the El Castillo retirement community in Santa Fe. Françoise was buried in Paris.

Books
(co-editor) Analogies Between Analogies: The Mathematical Reports of S.M. Ulam and his Los Alamos Collaborators (Los Alamos Series in Basic and Applied Sciences) , 1990, 
De Paris a Los Alamos, Une odyssée franco-americaine (French Edition), 1998,  - memoir

References

External links
Interview with the Los Alamos Historical Society

1918 births
2011 deaths
French emigrants to the United States
20th-century French Jews
American people of French-Jewish descent
Mount Holyoke College alumni
Mills College alumni
Santa Fe Institute people